Tsembaga Maring are a group of horticulturists who live in the highlands of New Guinea. They have been extensively studied by ethnographers, the foremost of which is Roy Rappaport.

Background
The study done in the Maring community of Papua New Guinea by Roy A. Rappaport during 1962 and 1963 is a good illustration of the bush fallow system of subsistence farming.

Ethnographies
Rappaport conducted research on the Maring in the 1960s, publishing his work in a book entitled Pigs for the Ancestors.

Lifestyle
The Maring are known for a special pattern of farming, hoarding of pigs, and warfare. Warfare usually proceeds after a ritual pig feast, known as kaiko.

External links
 Ritual and self-regulation of the Tsembaga Maring ecosystem in the New Guinea highlands

Ethnic groups in Papua New Guinea
Tribes of Oceania